Elena Satine (born November 24, 1987) is a Georgian-American actress and singer. On television, she has been featured as a series regular on the Starz period drama Magic City (2012–2013), the ABC drama Revenge (2014–2015), and the Netflix space Western Cowboy Bebop (2021). She has also made appearances on superhero-themed series, portraying Mera on Smallville (2010), Lorelei on Agents of S.H.I.E.L.D. (2014), and Sonya Simonson / Dreamer on The Gifted (2017).

Early life
Satine was born in Tbilisi, capital of what was then the Georgian Soviet Socialist Republic (current Georgia). Her mother was an opera singer and her father worked in the textile industry. At the age of five, Satine and her family moved to Sochi, and she became a part of the Georgian pop group Nergebi, a Mickey Mouse Club-like ensemble of child performers. She toured with Nergebi throughout Eastern Europe, including an appearance on children's variety show Utrennaya Zvezda (Morning Star) and later branched off into a solo career. At age 9, Satine became the youngest performer to headline at the Kinotavr Festival.

In 1998, while accompanying her mother on a business trip, Satine snuck away to audition for Professional Performing Arts School, and earned her admission on the spot. After convincing her parents to let her study in the United States, Satine moved to New York, and graduated from PPAS at age 16. Afterwards she continued her Dramatic studies at the Moscow Art Theatre School in Russia.

Career
Satine's television debut happened in an episode of  Cold Case, playing an immigrant Russian singer. She has since appeared on TV shows including Gemini Division, CW's Melrose Place, and the season 10 Smallville episode "Patriot", in which she played Mera, the wife of Aquaman. She also appeared on ITV's Poirot, in a 2010 episode that adapted Murder on the Orient Express.

Satine was for two years part of the main cast of the Starz series Magic City. The producers tailored the role of Judi Silver for Satine following her audition to play another part. Satine appeared on a 2014 episode of ABC's Agents of S.H.I.E.L.D. playing Lorelei, a villainous Asgardian. She followed with another  role in the same network, Louise Ellis in Revenge. Initially a recurring guest, Satine wound up promoted to the main cast eleven episodes into the season.

In 2017 she appeared in two episodes of Twin Peaks, and played Sonya in the Fox television series The Gifted.

In August 2019, Satine was cast as Julia in a live-action version of the Cowboy Bebop series, which was cancelled after the first season.

Personal life
Satine and Tyson Ritter, lead singer and bassist of the band The All-American Rejects, became engaged in April 2013 and married on December 31, 2013.

Filmography

Film

Television

Web series

Music video

References

External links
 

1987 births
Living people
21st-century actresses from Georgia (country)
Expatriate actresses in the United States
21st-century women singers from Georgia (country)
Film actresses from Georgia (country)
Expatriates from Georgia (country) in the United States
People from Sochi
Actors from Tbilisi
Television actresses from Georgia (country)